Baq Mej Rural District is a rural district (dehestan) in the Central District of Chenaran County, Razavi Khorasan Province, Iran. At the 2006 census, its population was 3,945, in 917 families.  The rural district has 5 villages.

References 

Rural Districts of Razavi Khorasan Province
Chenaran County